Mobala mammarenavirus is a species of virus in the genus Mammarenavirus.  It was isolated from a species of Praomys rodents in the Central African Republic.

References

Arenaviridae